The 2015 North Queensland Cowboys season was the 21st in the club's history. Coached by Paul Green and co-captained by Johnathan Thurston and Matthew Scott, they competed in the NRL's 2015 Telstra Premiership. The Cowboys celebrated 20 years as a club in 2015 and played in the first all-Queensland grand final, defeating the Brisbane Broncos 17–16 in golden point to win their first premiership.

Season summary
After going through their pre-season trials undefeated, the Cowboys started their 2015 season with three straight losses. The side hit back with three consecutive wins on Monday Night Football over the Melbourne Storm, Penrith Panthers and South Sydney Rabbitohs, on their way to a club record 11 game winning streak. The Cowboys finished in 3rd place, winning 17 games, giving the club their most successful regular season in its history.

Milestones
 Round 1: Jake Granville, Ben Hannant and Justin O'Neill made their debut for the club.
 Round 2: Kelepi Tanginoa made his debut for the club.
 Round 3: Lachlan Coote made his debut for the club.
 Round 3: Kane Linnett played his 100th NRL game.
 Round 7: Ben Hannant played his 200th NRL game.
 Round 7: Johnathan Thurston played his 250th NRL game.
 Round 11: The club played their 500th premiership game.
 Round 15: The club recorded their longest winning streak with their 11th straight win.
 Round 15: Rory Kostjasyn played his 50th game for the club.
 Round 16: Patrick Kaufusi made his NRL debut.
 Round 19: Gavin Cooper played his 200th NRL game.
 Round 21: Lachlan Coote played his 100th NRL game.
 Round 21: Matthew Scott played his 200th game for the club.
 Round 22: Antonio Winterstein played his 100th game for the club.
 Round 22: Antonio Winterstein scored his 50th try for the club.
 Round 24: Coen Hess made his NRL debut.
 Round 24: Coen Hess scored his first NRL try.
 Round 25: Antonio Winterstein played his 150th NRL game.
 Round 26: The club won the 2015 NRL Club Championship.
 Round 26: Paul Green coached his 50th NRL game.
 Finals Week 2: Kane Linnett played his 100th game for the club.
 Finals Week 3: Scott Bolton played his 150th game for the club.
 Finals Week 3: The club qualified for their second Grand Final.
 Grand Final: Rory Kostjasyn played his 100th NRL game.
 Grand Final: The club won its first NRL premiership.

Squad List

2015 NRL Squad

Squad Movement

2015 Gains

2015 losses

Re-signings

Ladder

Fixtures

NRL Auckland Nines 

The NRL Auckland Nines is a pre-season rugby league nines competition featuring all 16 NRL clubs. The 2015 competition was played over two days on January 31 and February 1 at Eden Park in Auckland, New Zealand. The Cowboys featured in the Waiheke pool and played Melbourne, Penrith and South Sydney. The top two teams of each pool qualified for the quarter finals. The Cowboys, who were the defending champions, were knocked out in the quarter-finals.

Pool Play

Pre-season

Regular season

Finals

Statistics

Representatives
The following players have played a representative match in 2015

Honours

League
Golden Boot: Johnathan Thurston
Clive Churchill Medal: Johnathan Thurston
Dally M Medal: Johnathan Thurston
Dally M Halfback of the Year: Johnathan Thurston
Dally M Lock of the Year: Jason Taumalolo
Dally M Captain of the Year: Matthew Scott and Johnathan Thurston 
Rugby League Players Association Player of the Year: Johnathan Thurston
NYC Team of the Year: Gideon Gela-Mosby, Coen Hess, Viliame Kikau

Club
Paul Bowman Medal: Johnathan Thurston
Players' Player: Jake Granville
Member's Player of the Year: Jake Granville
Club Person of the Year: Glenn Hall
Most Improved: Justin O'Neill  
Rookie of the Year: Coen Hess
NYC Player of the Year: Andrew Niemoeller  
Townsville Bulletins' Fan Choice Award: Johnathan Thurston

Feeder Clubs

National Youth Competition
 North Queensland Cowboys - 2nd, lost preliminary final

Queensland Cup
 Mackay Cutters - 8th, missed finals
 Northern Pride - 6th, lost elimination final
 Townsville Blackhawks - 1st, lost Grand Final

References

North Queensland Cowboys seasons
North Queensland Cowboys season